Poloniny may refer to:

 22469 Poloniny, an asteroid, discovered in 1997
 Poloniny National Park, in northeastern Slovakia
 Poloniny Dark-Sky Park, first dark sky park in Slovakia. 
 Połoniny, Warmian-Masurian Voivodeship, a place in Poland
 Poloniny, a variant name for the Polonynian Mountains

See also
 Polonyna (disambiguation)
 Polonia (disambiguation)